The Subcommittee on Rules and Organization of the House is a subcommittee within the House Rules Committee

Under the Committee rules, as amended for the 110th Congress, the Rules and the Organization of the House subcommittee will have general responsibility for measures or matters related to relations between the two Houses of Congress, relations between the Congress and the Judiciary, and internal operations of the House.

This subcommittee has the primary responsibility for the continued examination of the committee structure and jurisdictional issues of all House Committees.

In the past, the subcommittee has considered measures dealing with "fast track" procedures for consideration of trade legislation, prohibitions on unfunded mandates, the recodification of the rules of the House, issues relating to a 21st-century Congress and the impact of technology on the process and procedures of the House.

Members, 117th Congress 

Source:

Members, 116th Congress

Members, 115th Congress

References

External links
Rules Committee, Subcommittee page

Rules Rules and Organization of the House